André-Line Beauparlant (born 1966 in Montreal, Quebec) is a Canadian art director, production designer, set decorator and film director. She was nominated for a Genie Award for Best Achievement in Art Direction/Production Design for her work in Continental, a Film Without Guns (Continental, un film sans fusil) at the 28th Genie Awards and for Happy Camper (Camping sauvage), The Negro (Le nèg') and The Woman Who Drinks (La Femme qui boit) at the 25th Genie Awards. At the 28th Genie Awards, she was also nominated for Best Feature Length Documentary for her film Antlers (Panache).

In 2002, she was nominated for three Jutra Awards for Best Art Direction for La Femme qui boit and Marriages (Mariages) and for Best Documentary for Three Princesses for Roland (Trois princesses pour Roland). She is an alumna of the University of Montreal and a 1993 graduate of the National Theatre School of Canada.

In 2018, she received a nomination for Best Art Direction at the Prix Iris for Infiltration.

References

External links 
 
 Official website
 Biography of André-Line Beauparlant

Canadian art directors
Canadian documentary film directors
Film directors from Montreal
Université de Montréal alumni
Living people
National Theatre School of Canada alumni
Canadian production designers
Canadian set decorators
Canadian women film directors
French Quebecers
Women graphic designers
Women production designers
Université Laval alumni
Canadian graphic designers
1966 births
Canadian women documentary filmmakers